Spencer Township is one of the seventeen townships of Medina County, Ohio, United States.  The 2000 census found 2,429 people in the township, 1,682 of whom lived in the unincorporated portions of the township.

Geography
Located in the west part of the county, it borders the following townships:
Penfield Township, Lorain County - north
Litchfield Township - northeast corner
Chatham Township - east
Harrisville Township - southeast corner
Homer Township - south
Sullivan Township, Ashland County - southwest corner
Huntington Township, Lorain County - west
Wellington Township, Lorain County - northwest corner

The village of Spencer is located in central Spencer Township. The Spencer Lake Wildlife Area  is a 618-acre public hunting and fishing park featuring wetlands and a dog training area surrounding an artificial lake constructed in 1961, and rebuilt and enlarged in 1986. The park lies two miles east of the village of Spencer.

Name and history
Spencer Township has the name of Calvin Spencer, who helped build a school in exchange for the naming rights.  Statewide, other Spencer Townships are located in Allen, Guernsey, and Lucas counties and formerly in Hamilton County.

Government
The township is governed by a three-member board of trustees, who are elected in November of odd-numbered years to a four-year term beginning on the following January 1. Two are elected in the year after the presidential election and one is elected in the year before it. There is also an elected township fiscal officer, who serves a four-year term beginning on April 1 of the year after the election, which is held in November of the year before the presidential election. Vacancies in the fiscal officership or on the board of trustees are filled by the remaining trustees.

References

External links
County website

Townships in Medina County, Ohio
Townships in Ohio